The Bank of Magdalena at 1st and Main Streets in Magdalena, New Mexico was listed on the National Register of Historic Places in 1982.

It is a one-story flat-roofed brick building with decorative brickwork along parapets and cornices that was partly built before 1908 and completed by 1913.

It is one of few historic commercial buildings in Magdalena that are in good condition and is significant "as a good example of the Panel Brick Style in Magdalena."

See also

National Register of Historic Places listings in Socorro County, New Mexico

References

External links

Bank buildings on the National Register of Historic Places in New Mexico
Buildings and structures in Socorro County, New Mexico
National Register of Historic Places in Socorro County, New Mexico